Bullous drug reaction most commonly refers to a drug reaction in the erythema multiforme group. These are uncommon reactions to medications, with an incidence of 0.4 to 1.2 per million person-years for toxic epidermal necrolysis and 1.2 to 6.0 per million person-years for Stevens–Johnson syndrome. The primary skin lesions are large erythemas (faintly discernible even after confluence), most often irregularly distributed and of a characteristic purplish-livid color, at times with flaccid blisters.

See also 
 Skin lesion
 List of cutaneous conditions

References

External links 

Drug eruptions